The 2019 Women's Baseball Asian Cup is the second edition of the Women's Baseball Asian Cup. It was held at the 3,000-capacity Panda Memorial Stadium in Zhongshan, Guangdong, China from 9 to 15 November 2017. This is the first tournament which adopts a super round with the eight participating teams divided into two groups in the opening round. Host China, and the Philippines made their debut in competitive baseball in the tournament.

The tournament serves as the Asian qualifiers for the 2020 Women's Baseball World Cup with all four teams which advanced to the super round qualifying for the international tournament.

Teams
 (Hosts)

Opening round

Group A

|}

Group B

|}

Classification round

Super round

|}

3rd place game

|}

Final

|}

Final standing

Reference

Baseball Asian Cup
International baseball competitions hosted by China
Sports competitions in Guangdong
2010s in women's baseball
2019 in baseball
Baseball Asian Cup
Women's Baseball Asian Cup
November 2017 sports events in China